Exit 33 is a 2011 horror film directed by Tommy Brunswick, and written by Mark Myers and Norman Koza.

Plot 

While drunk and out hunting one day, Ike accidentally shot his pregnant wife in the eye, and since then he has been coerced by hallucinations or ghosts of his wife and unborn son into atoning for the act by acquiring replacement eyes. Whenever a woman he finds suitable stops at his gas station on Exit 33, Ike has them use a sabotaged pump that causes their vehicle to break down a short distance away. Ike then drives up, kills anyone with the woman, knocks her out and takes her back to the gas station, where he gouges out their eyes, and makes jerky out of their body. Ike preserves the eyes, and places them in one of the mounted hunting trophies in his den.

While on their way to their fifth high school reunion, Angie and Eve (whose boyfriend is beheaded with a hacksaw) are captured by Ike, who removes both of Eve's eyes and lets her exsanguinate. Every time a possible savior (such as Angie's boyfriend Matt, a pair of hunters, and an off-duty police officer) stop by, they are killed by Ike, who loses an eye himself during a fight with Matt. Angie's eyes are inevitably removed, and Ike places them in one of his hunting trophies. While relaxing in his den, Ike tells his imaginary son that he hopes next hunting season will be just as fruitful as this one.

Cast

Reception 

About.com gave Exit 33 a one out of five, calling it "cliché-ridden torture porn drivel" that suffered from repetitiveness, poor acting and flat characters. Mark L. Miller writing for Aint It Cool News said of the film "The acting is pretty amateur. The budget is low. The production is too." but ultimately recommended checking it out simply for Kane Hodder. JoBlo.com panned the film saying "The only thing this flick has going for it is that it stars Kane Hodder--and the guy really can't act. EXIT 33 feels like a student film with low-rate acting, cinematography, and special effects."

References

External links 

 
 

2011 films
American road movies
American slasher films
2011 horror films
Films set in 2010
American serial killer films
Films set in Michigan
Films about cannibalism
Films shot in Michigan
Films directed by Tommy Brunswick
2010s English-language films
2010s American films